"La partenza" is a 1749 canzonetta by Pietro Metastasio (1698-1782). It is among his most famous canzonettas and after being set by the poet himself was set again by many composers including Farinelli, Caffarelli, Giovanni Paisiello, Mozart, Beethoven himself and Beethoven's pupil Archduke Rudolph.

The first stanza goes:
Ecco quel fiero istante:
Nice, mia Nice, addio.
Come vivrò ben mio,
Così lontan da te?

Settings
 Pietro Metastasio
 Farinelli
 Caffarelli
 Giovanni Paisiello
 Mozart as "Ecco quel fiero istante", K. 436
 Beethoven, as WoO. 124
 Carl Blum
 Friedrich August Bungert 1884
 Johann Wilhelm Hertel
 Friedrich Wilhelm Rust as "La Partenza di Nice", 1784
 Rossini
 Bortniansky

References

1749 poems
1749 compositions